Philadelphus × purpureomaculatus is a flowering plant in the family Hydrangeaceae, of garden origin. It is a hybrid between Philadelphus × lemoinei and P. mexicanus 'Rose Syringa'. The flowers, which are strongly fragrant, are pure white with prominent purple markings near the centre; hence the Latin specific epithet purpureomaculatus, literally "purple spotted".

Valued in the garden as a summer-flowering shrub, the cultivars 'Sybille' and 'Belle Etoile' have gained the Royal Horticultural Society's Award of Garden Merit.

References

The Hillier Manual of Trees and Shrubs, Ed. John Hillier, David & Charles 2007,

External links

purpureomaculatus
Hybrid plants